Totoro may refer to:

 Totoro, a character in the 1988 Japanese animated film My Neighbor Totoro
 Totoro Station, a railway station in Japan
 Totoró, Cauca, a town and municipality in the Cauca Department, Colombia
 Totoro language, a language of Colombia
 Eoperipatus totoro, a species of velvet worm

See also 
 Toroto (disambiguation)